Arthur Gwynn was an Anglican priest in Ireland in the first half of the 17th century.
 
Gwynn was ordained on 1 December 1592. He was appointed Archdeacon of Lismore in 1638. Gwynn owed his preferment to the Lord Deputy of Ireland, Thomas Wentworth, 1st Earl of Strafford,

References

Archdeacons of Lismore
17th-century Irish Anglican priests